Robert Sweeting may refer to:

Robert Sweeting (cyclist) (born 1987), American cyclist
Robert Sweeting (politician), Bahamian politician